Muraltia flanaganii is a plant species in the milkwort family (Polygalaceae). The surface of the leaves are glabrous and rough to the touch. According to the Red List of South African Plants, the species is of least ecological concern. It was first described in the Journal of Botany, British and Foreign by Harry Bolus.

References

Polygalaceae